Sebastiaen van Aken or Sebastiaen Aken (bapt. 31 March 1648 - 21 November 1722) was a Flemish historical painter.

Life
Aken was born in Mechelen and became a pupil of Lucas Franchoys, the younger. He later went to Rome, where he studied under Carlo Maratti, and visited Spain and Portugal. A painting by him of St. Norbert is in the village church of Duffel, near Mechlin.  He died in his home city of Mechelen.

Notes

References

External links
Sebastiaen Aken at the RKD database.

1648 births
1722 deaths
Flemish Baroque painters
Artists from Mechelen
Pupils of Carlo Maratta